Jayson Bukuya (born 21 April 1989) is a Fiji former international rugby league footballer who played as a lock or  forward for the Cronulla-Sutherland Sharks in the NRL.

Bukuya previously played for Cronulla and the New Zealand Warriors in the National Rugby League. He has part of the Sharks team that won their maiden premiership title in the 2016 season. Bukuya also played a prominent role for Newtown during their 2019 campaign, where they lifted the highly coveted Canterbury Cup. He is now classified as a dual premiership winner.

Background
Bukuya was born in Brisbane, Queensland, Australia. Bukuya is of Fijian descent.

He attended Sandgate District State High School and St Patrick's College, Shorncliffe. He was also an Aspley and Norths Brisbane junior.

Playing career

2008-13
Bukuya made his National Rugby League debut for the Cronulla Sharks in 2008. Bukuya played all 4 games for Fiji at the 2008 World Cup, and was again named in the Fiji squad for the 2013 Rugby League World Cup. During his first stint with the Sharks, Bukuya played in 59 NRL games, and scored 13 tries.

2014
He joined the New Zealand Warriors for the 2014 season. He finished off the year playing 18 NRL games and scoring 2 tries.
On 1 November 2014, Bukuya was released from his Warriors' contract on compassionate grounds to return to Sydney.

2015-present
On 11 November 2014, Bukuya signed a two-year deal to rejoin the Cronulla-Sutherland Sharks. In 2016, he was a part of the Sharks maiden premiership winning grand final team.
In 2017, Bukuya was part of the Cronulla side which qualified for the finals but were eliminated in week one after suffering a shock defeat by North Queensland 15-14.  In 2018, Bukuya made 21 appearances for Cronulla as the club reached the preliminary final before being defeated by Melbourne 22-6.

Bukuya made a total of 16 appearances for Cronulla in the 2019 NRL season.  Bukuya played for Cronulla's feeder club Newtown in their 2019 Canterbury Cup NSW grand final victory over Wentworthville at the Western Sydney Stadium.
The following week, Bukuya played for Newtown in the NRL State Championship victory over the Burleigh Bears at ANZ Stadium.

On 13 June 2020, Bukuya announced his retirement from rugby league effective immediately.

On 18 July 2020, Bukuya played for Dubbo CYMS against North Sydney in the first round of a state-wide open competition.

References

External links

Cronulla Sharks profile
Sharks profile
League Central profile

1989 births
Living people
Australian people of Fijian descent
Australian people of Indian descent
Australian rugby league players
Cronulla-Sutherland Sharks players
Fiji national rugby league team captains
Fiji national rugby league team players
New Zealand Warriors players
Rugby league centres
Rugby league locks
Rugby league players from Brisbane
Rugby league second-rows